Captive is a 2015 American crime-drama thriller film directed by Jerry Jameson and written by Brian Bird and Reinhard Denke, based on the non-fiction book Unlikely Angel by Ashley Smith.

A true story about Brian Nichols, who escapes from the Fulton County courthouse in Atlanta on March 11, 2005 and holds Ashley Smith as a hostage, the film stars David Oyelowo as Nichols and Kate Mara as Smith. Filming began in October 2013 in North Carolina. The film was released worldwide on September 18, 2015 by Paramount Pictures.

Plot
On March 11, 2005, Brian Nichols escapes from the Fulton County courthouse in Atlanta, during his trial involving a rape case. In the process of the escape he murders the judge presiding over his trial, Rowland Barnes, as well as court reporter Julie Brandau. He also shoots Sergeant Hoyt Teasley while escaping from the courthouse, and then later kills ICE Special Agent David G. Wilhelm, who was off-duty at his home.

Nichols becomes the subject of a citywide manhunt. His frantic escape brings him to the apartment of Ashley Smith, a single mother and recovering methamphetamine addict, whom he holds hostage. Smith gets through the time by being inspired by Rick Warren's best-selling book The Purpose Driven Life while Nichols searches for redemption. As she reads aloud, Smith and her would-be killer come to a crossroads. Nichols eventually turns himself to the police.

Cast
 David Oyelowo as Brian Nichols, a convicted criminal who takes Ashley Smith hostage while on the run from the police
 Kate Mara as Ashley Smith, a young woman and single mother held captive by Nichols who tries to get through him by reading "A Purpose Driven Life"
 Michael K. Williams as Detective John Chestnut
 Leonor Varela as Detective Carmen Sanchez
 Jessica Oyelowo as Meredith MacKenzie
 Mimi Rogers as Kim Rogers
 Matt Lowe as Randy
 E. Roger Mitchell as Sergeant Teasley
 Bill Bennett as Sheriff Walters
 Scott Parks as Officer Henderson
 J. Karen Thomas as Mrs. Nichols, Brian's estranged wife
 Fred Galle as Atlanta Police Officer Boltbee
 Elle Graham as Paige
 Johanna Jowett as Cameron Sampson
 Claudia Church as Melissa
 Michael Harding as Commander Bradley Simpson
 William Boyer as Sniper
 Sydelle Noel as Lynn Campbell

Production

Development
On October 15, 2013, David Oyelowo and Kate Mara joined the thriller Captive based on the true story of Brian Nichols, who escapes from the courthouse in Atlanta on March 11, 2005, murdering the judge, a court reporter, a sheriff's deputy, and an off-duty federal agent. Later, he takes Ashley Smith hostage at her own house. BN Films set Jerry Jameson to direct the film, which was adapted by Brian Bird and Reinhard Denke, based on the Smith's non-fiction Unlikely Angel. Alex Garcia, Lucas Akoskin, Terry Botwick, Oyelowo and Ken Wales would be producing the film through Brightside Entertainment, 1019 Entertainment and Yoruba Saxon Productions. Oyelowo was set to play Nichols, Mara to play Smith, while Leonor Varela and Mimi Rogers were also in the cast. Michael K. Williams joined the film's cast on October 24, 2013 to play Detective John Chestnut. Jessica Oyelowo's involvement was confirmed on March 16, 2015, along with Jameson and Katrina Wolfe as producers.

Filming
Principal photography on the film began in October 2013 in North Carolina.

Release
On March 16, 2015, Paramount Pictures acquired the worldwide distribution rights to the film and set the film for a September 18, 2015 release date. On June 16, 2015, the first trailer for the film was released.

Reception
Captive has received generally negative reviews from critics, although praise was given towards the lead actors' chemistry. On Rotten Tomatoes, the film holds a rating of 27%, based on 52 reviews, with an average rating of 4.5/10. The site's consensus reads, "Captive undermines committed performances from Kate Mara and David Oyelowo – and the real-life story they're dramatizing – with a thin script doubling as an ad for a self-help book." James Rocchi of The Wrap called it "A Lifetime movie shoved into a cage and fattened with sermons and platitudes until it is ready to be served up cold and bland." But Linda Cook of the Quad City Times called it "a top-notch, captivating film." Michael Foust of The Christian Post labeled it "one of the most inspiring movies I've ever seen" and added it was "not the typical Christian movie." Foust wrote, "I suspect the movie ... succeeds because we can see a bit of ourselves in Smith or even Oyelowo, two broken people whose lives intersect on a tragic day in which the power of God's Word triumphed." On Metacritic the film has a score of 36 out of 100, based on 19 critics, indicating "generally unfavorable reviews".

Inaccuracies
In the film, Nichols is depicted shooting Judge Barnes from the front when in real life, Nichols snuck into the courtroom from the back and shot Barnes from behind. He is also shown killing Deputy Teasley inside the courthouse, when Nichols actually killed Teasley after he ran outside. Also, Nichols shot Teasley five times, while in the movie, he shoots him only twice.

Nichols took four hostages before the killings but in the film, he doesn't take any hostages aside from Smith.

References

External links
 
 
 
 
 

2015 films
2010s English-language films
2015 crime drama films
2015 crime thriller films
2010s prison films
American crime drama films
American crime thriller films
American thriller drama films
Biographical films about criminals
Crime films based on actual events
Drama films based on actual events
Films about kidnapping
Films about domestic violence
Films about rape
Films about drugs
Films about Christianity
Films about religion
Films based on non-fiction books
Films directed by Jerry Jameson
Films scored by Lorne Balfe
Films set in Atlanta
Films set in 2005
Films set in the 21st century
Films shot in North Carolina
Films about hostage takings
American prison drama films
Thriller films based on actual events
2010s American films